Jennifer Salling (born 4 July 1987) is a Canadian, former collegiate All-American, medal-winning Olympian and professional softball player. She played college softball at Oregon and Washington, and won a national championship at Washington in 2009. She has also played professionally in the National Pro Fastpitch for the USSSA Pride, Pennsylvania Rebellion and most recently the Canadian Wild. She represented Canada at the 2020 Summer Olympics, where she set the tournament batting average record for a single Olympic games, and won a bronze medal.

Career
Salling began her college softball career at Oregon in 2007, before transferring to Washington in 2008. She won a national championship at Washington in 2009. Salling was drafted third overall by the USSSA Pride in the 2011 NPF Draft and played for them from 2011–14. She most recently played for the Canadian Wild.

Team Canada
Salling represented Canada at the 2008 Summer Olympics. 

Salling again represented Canada at the 2020 Summer Olympics. During the tournament, she hit .571 (8-for-14) to break Lisa Fernandez's tournament record. She also recorded five RBIs on two doubles and a homer to slug .928%, walking six times in six games. She also had one of her hits in the bronze medal game against Team Mexico in a 3–2 victory for Team Canada.

References

External links
 

1987 births
Living people
Canadian softball players
Olympic softball players of Canada
Oregon Ducks softball players
Pennsylvania Rebellion players
Softball players at the 2008 Summer Olympics
Softball players at the 2020 Summer Olympics
Sportspeople from Burnaby
USSSA Pride players
Washington Huskies softball players
Softball players at the 2007 Pan American Games
Softball players at the 2011 Pan American Games
Softball players at the 2015 Pan American Games
Softball players at the 2019 Pan American Games
Pan American Games silver medalists for Canada
Pan American Games gold medalists for Canada
Medalists at the 2007 Pan American Games
Medalists at the 2011 Pan American Games
Medalists at the 2015 Pan American Games
Medalists at the 2019 Pan American Games
Medalists at the 2020 Summer Olympics
Olympic bronze medalists for Canada
Olympic medalists in softball
Pan American Games medalists in softball